Tibouchina mathaei is a species of flowering plant in the family Melastomataceae, native to Peru. It was first described by Alfred Cogniaux in 1885. The type specimen is kept at the Muséum National d'Histoire Naturelle in Paris.

References

mathaei
Flora of Peru
Plants described in 1885
Taxa named by Alfred Cogniaux